Maksim Yuryevich Zinovyev (born 15 July 1980) is a Russian former professional footballer.

Zinovyev played for FC Khimki in the Russian Premier League and for FC Metallurg Lipetsk in the Russian First Division and Russian Second Division.

Manager
Since 2015, the head coach of the women's football team WFC Rossiyanka "Rossiyanka".

In 2016 , he headed the newly created women 's football club  CSKA. Under the leadership of Maxim Yuryevich, the team won the Russian Cup (2017,2022), and also won the gold medals of the national championship twice (2019, 2020).

References

External links
 
 
 

1980 births
Living people
Russian footballers
Association football defenders
Russian expatriate footballers
Expatriate footballers in Poland
Expatriate footballers in Belarus
Russian expatriate sportspeople in Poland
Russian Premier League players
FC Khimki players
Śląsk Wrocław players
FC Metallurg Lipetsk players
FC Torpedo-BelAZ Zhodino players
FC Baltika Kaliningrad players
FC Luch Vladivostok players
FC Fakel Voronezh players
FC Torpedo Moscow players
FC Moscow players
FC Vityaz Podolsk players
FC Olimp-Dolgoprudny players
FC Volga Ulyanovsk players
FC Mashuk-KMV Pyatigorsk players
FC Dynamo Makhachkala players
Sportspeople from Lipetsk